
The Speech Assessment Methods Phonetic Alphabet (SAMPA) is a computer-readable phonetic script using 7-bit printable ASCII characters, based on the International Phonetic Alphabet (IPA). It was originally developed in the late 1980s for six European languages by the EEC ESPRIT information technology research and development program. As many symbols as possible have been taken over from the IPA; where this is not possible, other signs that are available are used, e.g. [@] for schwa (IPA ), [2] for the vowel sound found in French deux (IPA ), and [9] for the vowel sound found in French neuf (IPA ).

Today, officially, SAMPA has been developed for all the sounds of the following languages:

 Arabic
 Bosnian
 Bulgarian
 Cantonese
 Croatian
 Czech
 Danish
 Dutch
 English
 Estonian
 French
 German
 Greek
 Hebrew
 Hungarian
 Italian
 Norwegian
 Polish
 Portuguese
 Romanian
 Russian
 Scots
 Serbian
 Slovak
 Slovenian
 Spanish
 Swedish
 Thai
 Turkish

The characters ["s{mp@] represent the pronunciation of the name SAMPA in English, with the initial symbol ["] indicating primary stress. Like IPA, SAMPA is usually enclosed in square brackets or slashes, which are not part of the alphabet proper and merely signify that it is phonetic as opposed to regular text.

Features
SAMPA was developed in the late 1980s in the European Commission-funded ESPRIT project 2589 "Speech Assessment Methods" (SAM)—hence "SAM Phonetic Alphabet"—in order to facilitate email data exchange and computational processing of transcriptions in phonetics and speech technology.

SAMPA is a partial encoding of the IPA. The first version of SAMPA was the union of the sets of phoneme codes for Danish, Dutch, English, French, German and Italian; later versions extended SAMPA to cover other European languages. Since SAMPA is based on phoneme inventories, each SAMPA table is valid only in the language it was created for. In order to make this IPA encoding technique universally applicable, X-SAMPA was created, which provides one single table without language-specific differences.

SAMPA was devised as a hack to work around the inability of text encodings to represent IPA symbols. Consequently, as Unicode support for IPA symbols becomes more widespread, the necessity for a separate, computer-readable system for representing the IPA in ASCII decreases. However, text input relies on specific keyboard encodings or input devices. For this reason, SAMPA and X-SAMPA are still widely used in computational phonetics and in speech technology.

See also
 Comparison of ASCII encodings of the International Phonetic Alphabet
 SAMPA chart
 SAMPA chart for English, a concise version
 X-SAMPA, a language-independent notation similar to SAMPA, but covering the entire IPA repertoire
 BABEL Speech Corpus

References

 Ranchhod, Elisabeth & J. Mamede, Nuno (2002). Advances in Natural Language Processing: Third International Conference, PorTAL 2002, Faro, Portugal, June 23–26, 2002. Proceedings (Lecture Notes in Computer Science). (1st ed.). Springer. .
 L. DeMiller, Anna & Rettig, James (2000). Linguistics: A Guide to the Reference Literature (2nd ed.). Libraries Unlimited. .
 Lamberts, Koen & Goldstone, Rob (2004). Handbook of Cognition. Sage Publications Ltd. .

External links

 SAMPA computer readable phonetic alphabet
 Phonemic notation of English in SAMPA
 SAMPA for Scots 
 Converter from (German) written text to  SAMPA and IPA (Ajax-application)
 IPA-SAMPA Converter and IPA-SAMPA chart

 
1980s establishments in Europe
Writing systems introduced in the 1980s
1980s in computing